Lucid is a 2005 Canadian film written and directed by Sean Garrity. The film centres on Joel Rothman (Jonas Chernick), a man who is suffering from insomnia after having massive problems in his personal life including a separation and being targeted by his boss. As a psychotherapist he is assigned three patients suffering from posttraumatic stress disorder. He must treat them to figure out his own life.

It won the award for Best Western Canadian Film at the Vancouver International Film Festival in 2005.

References

External links
 

2005 films
2005 drama films
Canadian drama films
English-language Canadian films
Films directed by Sean Garrity
2000s English-language films
2000s Canadian films